is a railway station in the city of Shibata, Niigata, Japan, operated by East Japan Railway Company (JR East).

Lines
Shibata Station is served by the Uetsu Main Line, and is 26.0 kilometers from the terminus of the line at Niitsu Station. It is also served by the Hakushin Line and is 27.3 kilometers from the terminus of the line at Niigata Station.

Station layout
The station consists of one side platform and one island platform connected by an underground passage. The station has a Midori no Madoguchi staffed ticket office.

Platforms

History
The station opened on 2 September 1912. With the privatization of Japanese National Railways (JNR) on 1 April 1987, the station came under the control of JR East.

Passenger statistics
In fiscal 2017, the station was used by an average of 3,595 passengers daily (boarding passengers only).

Surrounding area
Shibata City Hall
Shibata Castle
Shimizuen garden

See also
 List of railway stations in Japan

References

External links

 JR East station information 

Railway stations in Japan opened in 1912
Railway stations in Niigata Prefecture
Uetsu Main Line
Hakushin Line
Shibata, Niigata